Gaston Tarry (27 September 1843 – 21 June 1913) was a French mathematician. Born in Villefranche de Rouergue, Aveyron, he studied mathematics at high school before joining the civil service in Algeria. He pursued mathematics as an amateur.

In 1901 Tarry confirmed Leonhard Euler's conjecture that no 6×6 Graeco-Latin square was possible (the 36 officers problem).

See also
List of amateur mathematicians
Prouhet-Tarry-Escott problem
Tarry point
Tetramagic square

References

External links

People from Villefranche-de-Rouergue
1843 births
1913 deaths
Combinatorialists
19th-century French mathematicians
20th-century French mathematicians